Leahy is an album by Canadian folk music group Leahy. It was released by Virgin Records in 1996. The album peaked at number 1 on the RPM Country Albums chart in July 1997.

Track listing
"B Minor" (Traditional) – 3:55
"Cape Breton Medley" (R. Cooper, Wiley Hunter, Jr., Traditional) – 5:11
"McBrides" (Dónal Lunny, Declan Sinnott) – 4:15
"The French" (Traditional) – 4:39
"The Call to Dance" (Gordon Duncan, Howie MacDonald) – 4:05
"Alabama" (G. Cahn, Ned Landry, J. Yeffen) – 3:40
"Don Messer Medley" (Don Messer, Traditional) – 3:05
"Csárdás" (Traditional) – 4:04
"Colm Quigley" (Donnell Leahy, Traditional) – 6:02
"The Coulin" (Traditional) – 4:44

Chart performance

References

1996 albums
Leahy albums
Virgin Records albums